Roland Vila (6 May 1949 – 15 May 1998) was a Catalan Swedish-language writer based in Sweden.

His first book Vi skiter i Godot (We don't care about Godot) which he wrote together with Pierre Guillet de Monthoux was published in 1981. The title of the book is a reference  to  Samuel Beckett's play Waiting for Godot. Roland wrote political books as well as autobiographies.

His second book Gugu's band, which he wrote in 1986 is an autobiography which portraits himself as a child at a boarding school in France.

He wrote his third book Anarki till Vardags (Everyday Anarchy), together with Thomas Hallon Hallberg in 1987. This is a political book which has been used in Swedish schools for educational purposes.

Roland had a keen interest for languages which can be seen in his books, where he playfully experiments continuously  with the Swedish language. Many Catalan, French and Spanish phrases can also be found in his books.

He is famous for his energetic and inspiring live readings of his books and has made appearances in front of large audiences including readings of his books at the famous Swedish festival of Hultsfred 1987 and 1988.

Roland was also one of the editors of the alternative Swedish magazine NU in the late 1970s.

Bibliography 

Vi skiter i Godot (1981) (We don't care about Godot), written together with Pierre Guillet de Monthoux.
Gugu's band (1986)
Anarki till Vardags  (1987) (Everyday Anarchy), written together with Thomas Hallon Hallberg
 Roll (1992)

Swedish-language writers
Writers from Catalonia
Anarchist writers
1998 deaths
1949 births
Swedish anarchists